Alexandra Hauka Nitta (born April 24, 1949) is an American former competition swimmer who represented the United States as a 15-year-old at the 1964 Summer Olympics in Tokyo, Japan.  Nitta swam in qualifying heats of the women's 200-meter breaststroke and posted a time of 2:48.4.

References

1949 births
Living people
American female breaststroke swimmers
Olympic swimmers of the United States
Sportspeople from Burbank, California
Swimmers at the 1964 Summer Olympics
21st-century American women